Saura Church is a parish church of the Church of Norway in Gildeskål Municipality in Nordland county, Norway. It is located in the village of Saura. It is one of the churches for the Gildeskål parish which is part of the Bodø domprosti (deanery) in the Diocese of Sør-Hålogaland. The white, wooden church was built in a long church style in 1884 using plans drawn up by the architect Carl J. Bergstrøm. The church seats about 250 people.

See also
List of churches in Sør-Hålogaland

References

Gildeskål
Churches in Nordland
Wooden churches in Norway
19th-century Church of Norway church buildings
Churches completed in 1884
1884 establishments in Norway
Long churches in Norway